The Manaslu Conservation Area is a protected area in Nepal. The area comprises mountains, glaciers, and watercourses.

Flora and fauna
The region is home to 33 species of mammals including snow leopard, musk deer and Himalayan tahr. There are over 110 species of birds and three species of reptiles and over 1500–2000 species of flowering plants. At least four species of frogs are present: Amolops formosus, Nanorana liebigii, Ombrana sikimensis, and Duttaphrynus himalayanus.

References

External links

Protected areas of Nepal
1998 establishments in Nepal
Wildlife conservation in Nepal